Linval Roy Carter (3 September 1951 – 11 September 2013), better known as Prince Jazzbo, was a Jamaican reggae and dancehall deejay and producer.

Career
Born in Clarendon Parish, Jamaica, and raised in Kingston, Linval Roy Carter (who would become known professionally as Prince Jazzbo) began his career with sound systems such as The Whip in Spanish Town. He began recording with Coxsone Dodd's Studio One label in the early 1970s under the name Prince Jazzbo, and also recorded for Glen Brown and Lee "Scratch" Perry. He went on to work on his own releases with Bunny Lee, producing as well in collaboration with many artists as a vocalist and producer for labels including his own, Ujama. The Perry-produced album Super Ape featured Jazzbo toasting on "Croaking Lizard". Jazzbo and fellow toaster I-Roy had a well reported, but friendly and mutually beneficial on-record clash during 1975, including the cuts "Straight to Jazzbo's Head" from I-Roy and the retort, "Straight to I-Roy's Head" from Prince Jazzbo.

Prince Jazzbo's early work with Clement "Coxsone" Dodd at Studio One produced several hits in 1972–1974 including: "School", "Fool For Love" and "Imperial I". His first hit in 1972 with Coxsone though was a version of Horace Andy's "Skylarking", which he re-worked as "Crabwalking". He ran the Ujama record label for many years. His very last message to the world and testament tune is known as 'All Haffi Bow' on a Ujama style riddim cut produced by AIRPUFF Records label on 6 September 2013.

Death
Carter died on 11 September 2013, aged 62, after a battle with lung cancer.

References

External links
 Prince Jazzbo Discography at roots-archives.com
 Prince Jazzbo Riddims at riddimguide.com

1951 births
2013 deaths
People from Clarendon Parish, Jamaica
Jamaican dancehall musicians
Jamaican reggae singers
Jamaican male singers
Deaths from lung cancer